"Soul Mate #9" is a song by Australian singer Tina Arena. It was recorded for her fourth studio album Just Me and was released as its lead single in September 2001. The single was only a moderate success, peaking just outside the top 20 in Australia. It also charted at #77 in Switzerland.

It was later included on Arena's greatest hits album Greatest Hits 1994–2004.

Track listing

CD single
"Soul Mate #9" – 3:26
"Soul Mate #9" (Nathan G Volume Radio Edit) – 3:18
"Soul Mate #9" (Big Boyz Remix) – 4:04
"It's Tonight" – 4:19

Charts and certifications

Peak positions

References

2001 songs
Tina Arena songs
Songs written by Desmond Child
Songs written by Tina Arena
Dance-pop songs
Columbia Records singles